Maria Assunta Accili Sabbatini (born 16 November 1955) is an Italian diplomat.

Biography 

Maria Assunta Accili Sabbatini was born in L'Aquila on 16 November 1955 to Maria Castellani and Achille Accili. Accili Sabbatini holds a degree in political science from the University of Rome La Sapienza, and a postgraduate degree in 'Management of Public Organizations' from Collège d'Europe of Bruges, Belgium.

Accili Sabbatini's diplomatic career began in 1980. She has been posted to Rabat, the Italian embassies in China and Pakistan, and to the Permanent Mission of Italy to OECD. Between 2003 and 2007, Accili Sabbatini was Italian representative to Taiwan. Beginning in 2012, she was Ambassador to Hungary. She was named the Permanent Representative of Italy to the United Nations (Vienna), Ambassador Extraordinary and Plenipotentiary in November 2016. She also serves as the permanent representative of Italy to the International Atomic Energy Agency.

Family 
Accili Sabbatini's father, Achille Accili, was an Italian Senator who had 4 children; of whom she is the eldest. Her brother, Domenico Accili, went on to become a medical professor at Columbia University.

Honors
 Grand Officer of the Order of Merit of the Italian Republic – December 27, 2006

See also 
 Ministry of Foreign Affairs (Italy)
 Foreign relations of Italy

References

1955 births
Living people
Permanent Representatives of Italy to the United Nations
People from L'Aquila
Sapienza University of Rome alumni
Italian diplomats
Italian women ambassadors
21st-century diplomats
20th-century diplomats
Ambassadors of Italy to Hungary
Grand Officers of the Order of Merit of the Italian Republic